Beam Ends is a 1937 novel by Australian actor Errol Flynn.

It was his first novel although he had written non fiction for many years.

See also

References

External links
Review of book at Kirkus
1937 Australian novels
New Guinea